The 1954–55 Cypriot Cup was the 18th edition of the Cypriot Cup. A total of 16 clubs entered the competition. It began on 18 June 1955 with the first round and concluded on 10 July 1955 with the final which was held at GSP Stadium. EPA Larnaca won their 5th Cypriot Cup trophy after beating Pezoporikos 2–1 in the final.

Format 
In the 1954–55 Cypriot Cup, participated the 10 teams of the Cypriot First Division and 6 of the 11 teams of the Cypriot Second Division (the three winners of each group and other three teams after a draw between the other 8 second division teams).

The competition consisted of four knock-out rounds. In all rounds each tie was played as a single leg and was held at the home ground of the one of the two teams, according to the draw results. Each tie winner was qualifying to the next round. If a match was drawn, extra time was following. If extra time was drawn, there was a replay match.

First round

Quarter-finals

Semi-finals

Final

Sources

Bibliography

See also 
 Cypriot Cup
 1954–55 Cypriot First Division

Cypriot Cup seasons
1954–55 domestic association football cups
1954–55 in Cypriot football